William Hess may refer to:

 Willy Hess (violinist) (1859–1939), violin virtuoso and violin teacher
 Willy Hess (composer) (1906–1997), Swiss musicologist, composer, and Beethoven scholar
 William E. Hess (1898–1986), U.S. representative
 Bill Hess (1923–1978), head coach
 William J. Hess (died 1988), American architect
 William M. Hess (1928-2017), American chemist known for contributions to characterization of carbon black dispersion in rubber